Borawan is a village in Khargone district in the Indian state of Madhya Pradesh.

Geography
Situated on the Veda River, Borawan lies 15 km from Kasrawad. It falls under Kasrawad Tehsil of Khargone district.

Education
Borawan is home to several colleges including the Jawaharlal Institute of Technology (JIT) and Institute of Pharmacy (GRY), both affiliated to RGPV, Bhopal.

References

External links
 Kasrawad Tehsil
 Khargone District

Villages in Khargone district